The Cheater is a lost 1920 silent film drama directed by Henry Otto and starring May Allison.  It was released by Metro Pictures.

Cast
May Allison - Lilly Meany
King Baggot - Lord Asgarby
Frank Currier - Peg Meany
Harry von Meter - Bill Tozer  (*as Harry Van Meter)
May Giraci - Eve Asgarby (*as May Geraci)
Percy Challenger - Mr. Prall
Lucille Ward - Mrs. Prall
P. Dempsey Tabler - Doctor
Alberta Lee - Nurse

uncredited
Rudolph Valentino - Extra

References

External links

 Moving Picture World; The Cheater(archived)

1920 films
American silent feature films
Lost American films
Films directed by Henry Otto
American films based on plays
American black-and-white films
Silent American drama films
1920 drama films
Metro Pictures films
1920 lost films
Lost drama films
1920s American films
1920s English-language films